Casa de Mujeres ("House of Women") is a 1966 Mexican drama film directed by Julián Soler and starring Dolores del Río. In some countries the film was named El Hijo de Todas ("The Son of All").

Plot
At a Christmas party, the women of a luxurious brothel all decide to take a baby as their "mothers" and decide to reform when at a nearby home, a woman gives birth to a baby boy and dies in child birth. 

Over the years, the child becomes an adult male. The conflict comes when the child informs them of his upcoming marriage, and his "mothers" face the fear of being rejected and segregated by their own son by their previous lives as prostitutes.

Details
Casa de Mujeres was the last film in which the legendary actress Dolores del Río starred in her native country. She played the role of a madame of a brothel. Del Río's performance in this movie shocked the public because of how she stood out among all the young actresses. The film was not a critical success, but it was very financially successful.
One critic wondered: Has Mexican cinema come a long way from Santa to Casa de Mujeres?"

Cast
 Dolores del Río as Gilda, "La Doña"
 Elsa Aguirre
 Susana Cabrera
 Elsa Cárdenas
 Rosa María Vazquez
 Martha Romero
 Fernando Soler
 Carlos López Moctezuma
 Enrique Álvarez Félix as "The Son"

References

External links

1960s Spanish-language films
1966 drama films
1966 films
Mexican drama films
1960s Mexican films